The Druk Chirwang Tshogpa (Wylie: ’brug spyir-dbang tshogs-pa, DCT; English: Bhutan Commoner's Party or Party of the Common People of Bhutan) was a Bhutanese political party. It was registered on January 7, 2013. In the primary round of the 2nd National Assembly elections held in 2013, the DCT had 12,457 votes and came fourth place, not winning in any constituency, and so could not take part in the final round. The Election Commission of Bhutan announced on February 26, 2018 that the Party was being deregistered on its own request. The party then merged with Druk Phuensum Tshogpa.

See also
List of political parties in Bhutan 
2013 Bhutanese National Assembly election

Notes

External links
Druk Chirwang Tshogpa website

Political parties in Bhutan
Political parties established in 2013
Social democratic parties in Asia